Titanic Rising is the fourth studio album by American musician Weyes Blood, released on April 5, 2019 by Sub Pop. On January 17, 2019, Weyes Blood released the album's first single, "Andromeda". A second single, "Everyday", was released along with an accompanying self-directed music video on February 12, 2019.

The album received universal acclaim from critics, garnering an aggregate score of 91 out of 100 on Metacritic, with praise going towards its powerful ambience and vulnerable lyrics.

Production

Recording
Following the release of Front Row Seat to Earth, Natalie Mering signed with Sub Pop in 2017. Titanic Rising was recorded in 2018 over a three month period at Sonora Studios in Los Angeles and was produced by Jonathan Rado. The album named after the RMS Titanic and the 1997 film based on the ship's sinking, which had a profound impact on Mering when she was younger.

Music and lyrics
The album's music has been described as soft rock with influences from 1970s artists such as Joni Mitchell and the Carpenters, as well as chamber pop.

The opening track "A Lot's Gonna Change", a song that Mering described as setting the overall theme of Titanic Rising, deals with the yearning for a return to the simpler times of childhood, as well as learning how to cope with changes without being bogged down with hopelessness. "Andromeda", inspired by the galaxy and the mythological figure of the same name, deals with finding love in a world of distractions and past disappointments and features a LinnDrum. "Everyday" has an upbeat melody and lyrics about the struggles of online dating. Climate change is also a central theme of the album, with the Titanic used as a metaphor for this.

Mering described the title track, an instrumental, as an interlude between the album's first half, which deals with hope and love, and the second half, which deals with "an existential sub-zone." "Movies" features synth arpeggios in the first half before giving way to strings. Lyrically, the song deals with Mering's disillusionment with movies as a teenager and how she felt they lied to her. "Picture Me Better" is about a friend that committed suicide while Mering was making the album, while the finale track on the album, "Nearer to Thee", is a reference to the alleged final song the band on the RMS Titanic played before the ship sank.

Artwork
The album cover features Mering submerged in an underwater bedroom. The cover was photographed by Brett Stanley in a Long Beach, California pool. Commenting on the cover's meaning, Mering stated that she thought of water as symbolizing the subconscious, and that a bedroom lives in this subconscious space due to its role as "a safe [..] and imaginative space" that shapes people's beliefs and identities.

Release
On January 17, 2019, Weyes Blood released the album's first single, "Andromeda". A second single, "Everyday", was released along with an accompanying self-directed music video on February 12, 2019. The album's third single, "Movies", was released along with an accompanying self-directed music video on March 19, 2019. On May 27, 2020, the "Wild Time" music video was released. The Japanese bonus track, "Titanic Risen", was released in January 2021 exclusively on Roblox's sinking ship simulator, and on April 4, the track was released on streaming services after the Roblox Titanic room was sunk.

Critical reception

Titanic Rising received widespread acclaim from contemporary music critics. At Metacritic, which assigns a normalized rating out of 100 to reviews from mainstream critics, the album has an average score of 91 based on 26 reviews, indicating "universal acclaim".

AllMusic praised the record, stating that "she underscores enormously orchestrated pop songs with eerie experimental ambience, imagining a dreamworld where Joni Mitchell's late-'70s output was produced by Brian Eno." Quinn Moreland, writing for Pitchfork, described the album as "a grand, sentimental ode to living and loving in the shadow of doom" and "her most ambitious and complex work yet". Dazed Digital stated that, "pairing a rich, 70s soft-rock palette with rippling undercurrents of dread, it already feels like one of the year's best records, and a poignant document on what it feels like to inhabit this particular moment in time."

Track listing

Personnel
Credits adapted from liner notes.

Musicians
 Michael D'Addario 
 Brian D'Addario 
 Michael Long 
 Richard Dodd 
 Leah Katz 
 Daphne Chen 
 Eric Gorfain 
 Drew Erickson 
 Jonathan Rado 
 Blake Mills 
 Chris Cohen 
 Keith Karman 
 Walt McClements 
 Kenny Gilmore 
 Michael Chadwick 

Technical personnel
 Kenny Gilmore – mixing
 Dave Cerminara – engineering
 Sarah Tudzin – additional engineering
 Tristan Rodman – additional engineering
 Drew Erickson- arranger
 Brian D'Addario - arranger (1 & 10)
Artwork
 Brett Stanley – photography, set builds
 Jenny Baumert – assistance
 Ryan Waller – assistance
 Elijah Funk – layout

Charts

See also
 Titanic in popular culture
 Climate change in music

Notes

References

2019 albums
Sub Pop albums
Weyes Blood albums
Albums produced by Jonathan Rado
Albums about climate change
Works about RMS Titanic